Lil' Eightball is a Walter Lantz character voiced by Mel Blanc, who made his first appearance in the cartoon "The Stubborn Mule" in 1939. His final appearance was in 1939, in "A Haunting We Will Go". He is a  racially offensive caricature of an African-American child.

"A Haunting We Will Go" is the first Walter Lantz cartoon made in three-strip Technicolor.  From this point onward, all of the Lantz cartoons would be produced in color.

List of appearances:
"The Stubborn Mule" (July 3, 1939)
"Silly Superstition" (August 28, 1939)
"A Haunting We Will Go" (September 4, 1939)

Lil' Eightball appeared on the cover of Lantz's monthly anthology comic book New Funnies (published by Dell Comics), from at least issue #65 (July 1942).

Responding in 1947 to a group of eight-year-old schoolchildren who had complained about Eight Ball, Dell's managing editor Oskar Lebeck wrote:

The last appearance of the character was in issue #126, the August 1947 issue.

See also
List of Walter Lantz cartoons
List of Walter Lantz cartoon characters

References

External links 
 
 The Walter Lantz-o-Pedia

Film characters introduced in 1939
Universal Pictures cartoons and characters
Walter Lantz Productions shorts
Fictional African-American people
Articles containing video clips
Walter Lantz Productions cartoons and characters